Christos Frantzeskakis (born 26 April 2000 in Chania) is a Greek athletics competitor competing in the hammer throw. He competed in the men's hammer throw event at the 2020 Summer Olympics held in Tokyo, Japan.

Career 

In 2019, he won the gold medal in the men's hammer throw event at the Balkan Athletics Championships held in Pravets, Bulgaria. In that same year, he competed in the men's hammer throw at the 2019 World Athletics Championships held in Doha, Qatar. He did not qualify to compete in the final.

He took the ninth place in the men's hammer throw event at the 2022 World Athletics Championships held in Eugene, Oregon, United States.

International competitions

References

External links 
 

Living people
2000 births
Greek male hammer throwers
World Athletics Championships athletes for Greece
Athletes (track and field) at the 2020 Summer Olympics
Olympic athletes of Greece
21st-century Greek people

Sportspeople from Chania